The name Mona has been used for three tropical cyclones worldwide.

Eastern Pacific:
 Hurricane Mona (1963), a Category 1 hurricane that made landfall in western Mexico. 

South Pacific:
 Cyclone Mona (2000), a severe tropical cyclone that caused moderate damage in Tonga. 
 Cyclone Mona (2019), a moderate tropical cyclone that had minimal impact on land.

Pacific hurricane set index articles
South Pacific cyclone set index articles